Bellavia Janet Ribeiro-Addy (born 1 March 1985) is a British Labour Party politician who has served as the Member of Parliament for Streatham since the 2019 general election. Solidly on the left of the Party, she considers herself a "life-long socialist" and a feminist and was briefly Shadow Minister for Immigration in 2020.

Early life
Born and raised in Streatham, south London, Ribeiro-Addy grew up in a working-class family on a council estate on Brixton Hill. She is Christian and of Ghanaian descent.

Ribeiro-Addy was able to attend the independent Streatham and Clapham High School on a scholarship. She went on to graduate with a Bachelor of Science degree in Biomedical Science with Ethics & Philosophy of Science from the University of Bradford in 2006. She then completed a Master of Arts degree in Medical Law & Ethics at Queen Mary University of London, awarded in 2007, and a Graduate Diploma in Law at BPP Law School, awarded in 2015.

She was the National Black Students' Officer for the National Union of Students (NUS) from 2008 to 2010, national co-ordinator of the Student Assembly Against Racism, and the national convenor of the NUS' Anti-Racism/Anti-Fascism campaign. In 2010, she and LGBT+ officer Daf Adley pushed the Durham Union Society to cancel a debate on multiculturalism, threatening to bus coaches of students to Durham for a "colossal demonstration" if BNP MEP Andrew Brons were to speak on campus.

Political career
Between 2016 and 2019, Ribeiro-Addy was chief of staff to former Labour frontbencher Diane Abbott. Ribeiro-Addy served as a school governor at Saint Gabriel's College, Camberwell, from 2018 to 2022.

In the 2019 general election, Ribeiro-Addy was elected as the Labour member of parliament (MP) for Streatham, with a majority of 17,690 votes.

Ribeiro-Addy in her maiden speech called for some form of reparations to former colonial subjects, and spoke of the injustices faced by black people in Britain. In one of her first news interviews as an MP, she called for the decriminalisation of homosexuality in Ghana, stating that it is her duty to make sure all people are free, and not discriminated against.

In January 2020, Ribeiro-Addy was appointed as Shadow Minister for Immigration, just weeks after her election as a member of parliament. She was not retained in the role following the election of Sir Keir Starmer as Labour leader. Ribeiro-Addy became the co-chairperson of Labour's left-wing Socialist Campaign Group.

She has challenged the role of the media in devaluing black female MPs, particularly regarding errors by BBC Parliament and other outlets involving the mislabelling of photos of black female Labour MPs Marsha de Cordova and Dawn Butler.

Ribeiro-Addy – whose first UK-born black relative was Thomas Birch Freeman, born in Twyford, Hampshire, in 1809 – has called for better black history education in schools, saying: "Our civil rights struggle here in the UK is not one that we learn about as much."

During the COVID-19 pandemic, Ribeiro-Addy called on the government to release people held in immigration detention centres.

Ribeiro-Addy is a supporter of adopting a Zero-COVID strategy to combat the COVID-19 pandemic and wrote an article in June 2021 in support of delaying the lifting of lockdown, criticised a "vaccine only" approach and called for the continuation of restrictions until case numbers reach zero. In December 2021, she voted against the introduction of vaccine passports and mandatory vaccination of NHS staff.

On 24 February 2022, following the 2022 Russian invasion of Ukraine, Ribeiro-Addy was one of 11 Labour MPs threatened with losing the party whip after they signed a statement by the Stop the War Coalition which questioned the legitimacy of NATO and accused the military alliance of "eastward expansion". All 11 MPs subsequently removed their signatures.

References

External links
 Official website

Living people
1985 births
21st-century British women politicians
Alumni of Queen Mary University of London
Alumni of the University of Bradford
Black British MPs
Black British women politicians
British anti-racism activists
British socialist feminists
English anti-fascists
English Christian socialists
English people of Ghanaian descent
English socialists
Female members of the Parliament of the United Kingdom for English constituencies
Labour Party (UK) MPs for English constituencies
People educated at Streatham and Clapham High School
People from the London Borough of Lambeth
School governors
UK MPs 2019–present